KVMO (104.3 FM) is a radio station serving Northeast Missouri and parts of Western Illinois, including the Hannibal, Missouri/Quincy, Illinois micropolitan area as a carrier for conservative talk radio formatted ‘RealTalk 93.3’, flagship KRTK. KVMO is licensed to East Central Broadcasting of Washington, Missouri, and broadcasts from a tower 8 miles north of Vandalia, Missouri.

History
KVMO had the call letters KKAC from 2001-2019; and from 2001-2012 was originally a Country Music station called Action Country.  
In 2012, the station went back on the air briefly as a Soft Adult Contemporary format dubbed The Oasis; which gave way to an Adult Album Rock format called 104.3 FMX from 2013-2016, when the station was forced into receivership and temporarily off the air.

Up until The end of December 2018, KVMO was airing a format of adult album alternative rock, but in late January 2019 switched to a simulcast of country music station 99.9 KFAV Warrenton, Missouri; and several months later started relaying sister station KWUL Elsberry, Missouri with a hybrid format of Classic Rock and Americana music.  The former V104.3 Adult Alternative Rock format which KVMO aired form Fall 2017 through January 2019 was available through 2020 with many of the same hosts as an online only radio station.

In July 2021, it was announced that KVMO will simulcast 93.3 FM; now known as KRTK, this time airing a conservative talk format, branding as ‘RealTalk 93.3’.

With the expansion of "Real Talk" to other frequencies, in November 2021, the group of stations were called "The Real Talk Radio Network."

External links

VMO
Radio stations established in 2001
2001 establishments in Missouri
Conservative talk radio
Talk radio stations in the United States